Colias wiskotti is a butterfly in the family Pieridae. It is found in Turkestan, Uzbekistan, Afghanistan, Tajikistan, and Kashmir. The habitat consists of xerophytic mountains.

It is a highly polymorphous species with a lot of varieties or forms described. Adults are on wing from June to August.

The larvae feed on Acantolimon, Oxytropis, and Onobrychis echidna.

Subspecies
The following subspecies are recognised:
C. w. wiskotti (western Ghissar)
C. w. sagina Austaut, 1891 (eastern Ghissar, Darvaz)
C. w. separata Grum-Grshimailo, 1888 (Alaisky Mountains)
C. w. aurea Kotzsch, 1937 (western Pamirs)
C. w. draconis Grum-Grshimailo, 1891 (western Tian-Shan)
C. w. sweadneri Clench & Shoumatoff, 1956 (Afghanistan)

Gallery

References

Grieshuber, J. & Worthy, B., 2006 A revision of Colias wiskotti Staudinger, 1882, the available names and the type material, with a note on Colias alpherakii Staudinger, 1882 (Lepidoptera, Pieridae). Mitt. Münch. Ent. Ges.96: 43-75, 26 figs.

External links
Global Butterfly Information System type information
Global Butterfly Information System wiskotti images (24)
Global Butterfly Information System wiskotti blanda images
Global Butterfly Information System wiskotti aurea images

wiskotti
Butterflies described in 1882
Butterflies of Asia
Taxa named by Otto Staudinger